Radovan Sloboda ( in Banská Bystrica) is a Slovak politician, an entrepreneur and a sports manager. He has been a Member of National Council of The Slovak Republic since 2020. He represents a political party, Freedom and Solidarity. He is also a member of Council of Slovak Tennis Association and the chairman of Tennis Club of Baseline Banská Bystrica.

Early life
Radovan Sloboda was born in Teplice. He studied Economics of Transportation at the University of Economics in Prague. After having graduated from the university, he stayed and worked in Prague. Then he came back to the Slovak Republic and he started a business. He has been engaged in sports issues since 1999, he represents sports movement in National Council of The Slovak Republic. He also works as a member of Council of Slovak Tennis Association and he is also the chairman of Tennis Club of TC Baseline Banská Bystrica.

Political career
Radovan Sloboda was elected for a MP of National Council of The Slovak Republic in the general elections in 2020 for the party Freedom and Solidarity. In the general elections he gained 1863 preferential votes which quarantined him 19th place in Freedom and Solidarity. In National Council of The Slovak Republic he works as the vice-chairman of the Education, Science, Youth, Sport Committee. He is also a member of the Supervisory Committee of Slovak Information Service.

Honors
Radovan Sloboda has received several awards in recognition of long-term work for Slovak sport. As the not playing captain he has gained three Slovak league medals. He received twice the Award of the Town "Sports Team of the Town Banská Bystrica" in recognition of a great development of sport. He has also got a memorial medal of Slovak Tennis Association for long-term work.

References

Freedom and Solidarity politicians
Slovak sports executives and administrators
Slovak businesspeople
Slovak politicians
1966 births
Living people
People from Banská Bystrica
Members of the National Council (Slovakia) 2020-present
Prague University of Economics and Business alumni